Lepidocephalichthys thermalis, known as the common spiny loach or the spotted loach,  is a freshwater fish species found in India and Sri Lanka.

They are found usually in quiet, flowing waters with a sandy substrate. It grows to  standard length.

Related species and diagnosis

Also endemic Lepidocephalichthys jonklaasi is found in Sri Lanka. Jayaram (1981) reports that at least six other species occur in the north-eastern part of India (Assam to Burma). Tilak & Hussain (1981) have written a review on the systematics of the Indian members of the genus.

Lepidocephalichthys jonklaasi is distinguished from L. furcatus, L. micropogon, L. manipurensis, and L. goalparensis by rounded/truncated (vs. forked) caudal fin, from L. irrorata and L. kranos by absence of scales on top of head, from L. guntea, L. hasselti, L. tomaculum, L. alkaia, and L. annandalei by broad regularly spaced dark bars (vs. reticulations, spots, or stripe) on caudal fin, from L. thermalis, L. arunachalensis, L. coromandelensis, and L. berdmorei by vertically elongated, dark spots on side that form irregular, thin bars (vs. round spots that sometimes form squares or thin stripe), and from L. lorentzi by thinner, more irregularly spaced dark side bars, dorsal-fin origin anterior (vs. posterior) to pelvic-fin origin, and larger size (to 45 vs. 33 mm SL), (Havird & Page  2010).

The two Sri Lankan species L. jonklaasi and L. thermalis are not very closely related. They are easily differentiated by body shape and proportions, colour pattern, and form of sexual dimorphism that is unique to L. jonklaasi. Further, a mature adult L. jonklaasi is significantly longer than L. thermalis. It is not easily confused with L. thermalis owing to its distinctive colour pattern and robust, tubular body.

References

Amarasinghe. U. S., shirantha. R. R. A. R., Wijeyaratne. M. J. S., (2006); Some Aspects of Ecology of Endemic Freshwater fishes of Sri Lanka; The Fauna of Sri Lanka Status of Taxonomy, Research and Conservation, IUCN Sri Lanka.
Bambaradeniya, C.N.B. (2003); An overview of the flora and fauna of the Kanneliya- Dediyagala-Nakiyadeniya forest Complex- A Proposed Biosphere Reserve in Sri Lanka; Journal of the National Science Foundation of Sri Lanka.
Bambaradeniya, C.N.B., Perera, M.S.J., Perera, W.P.N., Wickramasinghe, L.J.M., Kekulandala, L.D.C.B., Samarawickrama, V.A.P., Fernando, R.H.S.S., & Samarawickrama, V.A.M.P.K. (2003); Composition of faunal species in the Sinharaja World Heritage Site in Sri Lanka; The Sri Lanka Forester.
Chamikara S.S. (2001); founa diversity of Beraliya-Mookalana- Pituwala; Ministry of Environment, The Society for Environmental Education; Unpublished report.
Chamikara S.S. (2002); The diversity of freshwater fishes and current status. The Society for Environmental Education; Unpublished report.
Chamikara S.S. (2003); Dombagas kanda mathsya vividatwaya ha warthamana thtwaya (The diversity of freshwater fishes of Dombagas kanda and present status). Parisara sangrahaya (May–June) The Society for Environmental Education; Unpublished report.
Chamikara S.S. (2003); Fish diversity and present status of wet forests in Pahiyangala, Weligalpotta and Horanekanda; The Society for Environmental studies. Unpublished report.
Daraniyagala, P.E.P., (1952); A colored atlas of some vertebrates from Ceylon, volume one, Fishes, Ceylon national museums, Colombo.
De Silva, M.P. (1998); Biodiversity in the catchments of Hiyare Reservoir; Proceedings of the 2nd Annual Forestry Symposium 1996.
Ekaratne, K., Fernando, R.H.S.S., De silva, S., Bambaradeniya, C.N.B., De silva, D., (2003); A Comparison of the Conservation and Legal Status of the Fauna and Flora of Sri Lanka, IUCN Sri Lanka.
Gamage,S. N., Liyanage, W. K. D. D., Gunawardena, A. & Wimalasuriya, S. ; 2006; Vertebrate diversity in a thirty year old analogue forest in Pitigala, Elpitiya, in the Galle District of Southern Sri Lanka; RUHUNA JOURNAL OF SCIENCE, Faculty of Science, University of Ruhuna.
Gerhard, H. F. & Hans-jurgen, (2003- Unbublished); A new record of Lepidocephalichthys jonklaasi (Daraniyagala, 1956) (Teleostei; Cypriniformes, Cobitidae); (Unpublished).
Havird, J. C.  and Page, L. M. ; 2010; A Revision of Lepidocephalichthys (Teleostei: Cobitidae) with Descriptions of Two New Species from Thailand, Laos, Vietnam, and Myanmar; Copeia online publication
Herath, T. & Jayasinghe, H., (2005); Diversity of freshwater fish species of Pahiyangala & Yatagampitiya Proposed Reserve area; (Unpublished).
IUCN, (2000); The 1999 list of threatened fauna and flora of Sri Lanka, IUCN Sri Lanka.
IUCN, (2007); The 2007 list of threatened fauna and flora of Sri Lanka, IUCN Sri Lanka.
Jayaneththi, H. B. & Madurapperuma P. L., (2004);  A new record of Lepidocephalichthys jonklaasi Daraniyagala, 1956 (Cobitidae; Cypriniformes) from Pahiyangala, Kalu River basin.,  SRI LANKA NATURALIST, JOURNAL OF ECOLOGY AND NATURE, Young Zoologist's Association of Sri Lanka.
Jayaweera, S. & Herath, T., (2009); Biodiversity Report- Boralugoda, Organisation for Aquatic Resours Management (OARM) (Unpublished).
Manamendra-Arachchi,  K. N. (1987) ; The Loaches of Sri Lanka, Loris, Journal of the wildlife and Nature Protection Society of Sri Lanka.
Ministry of forestry & environment (2000); Statistical compendium on natural resources management Sri Lanka-2000, Ministry of forestry & environment.
Pethiyagoda, R., (1991); Fresh water fishes of Sri Lanka; WHT publications, Colombo.
Pethiyagoda, R., (2000) ; The fauna and flora protection ordinance; Loris, Journal of the wildlife and Nature Protection Society of Sri Lanka.
Pethiyagoda, R., (2006); Conservation of Sri Lankan Freshwater Fishes; The Fauna of Sri Lanka Status of Taxonomy, Research and Conservation, IUCN Sri Lanka.
Ranasinghe, P. N. & Rathnayayake, A.,(1992); Fauna and Flora of Dombagaskanda forest and its conservation, Young Zoologist's Association of Sri Lanka.
Senanayake, F. R. (1980); The biogeography and ecology of the inland fishes of Sri Lanka, (unpublished; Ph.D. Dissertation, Department of Wildlife & fisheries biology, University of California, Davis.
Senanayake, F. R. (1987) ; A checklist of the freshwater fishes of Sri Lanka, Loris, Journal of the wildlife and Nature Protection Society of Sri Lanka.
Senanayake, F. R., Soule, M., & Senner, J. W. (1977); Habitat values and endemicty in the vanishing rain forests of Sri Lanka, Nature.
Wildlife conservation society (2008); the study of the faunal diversity in Galle district, southern Sri Lanka, Wildlife conservation society, Galle Sri Lanka.

External links
http://www.mapress.com/zootaxa/2010/f/zt02557p018.pdf

Cobitidae
Freshwater fish of India
Freshwater fish of Sri Lanka
Fish described in 1846
Taxa named by Achille Valenciennes